Joseph Thomas Levandoski (March 17, 1921 – December 20, 2001) was a professional ice hockey player who played eight games in the National Hockey League.  He played with the New York Rangers.

External links

1921 births
2001 deaths
Canadian ice hockey left wingers
Ice hockey people from Ontario
New York Rangers players
People from Cobalt, Ontario
Canadian expatriates in the United States